Enorme is the sixth album by Mexican singer Alejandra Guzmán. It was released in 1994.

Track listing
 "Cuando Dos Van a Muerte"   (C. Sanchez; C. Valle)
 "Pasa la Vida"  (C. Sanchez; C. Valle)
 "Despertar" (C. Sanchez; C. Valle)
 "Dan Tanto Miedo"  (C. Sanchez; C. Valle)
 "De un Trago"  (C. Sanchez; C. Valle)
 "No Hay Nadie Como Tú"  (C. Sanchez; C. Valle)
 "Baila"  (C. Sanchez; C. Valle)
 "Amigo"  (C. Sanchez; C. Valle)
 "Morir de Amor"  (C. Sanchez; C. Valle)
 "Corazones Rotos" (C. Sanchez; C. Valle)

Singles

1994 albums
Alejandra Guzmán albums